Greater Budapest is the name of Budapest in its present, extended size, as it was created by the Law No. XXVI of 1949 passed on December 15, 1949 and it came into force on January 1, 1950. By attaching 7 towns and 16 villages to the former Budapest, its area enlarged from 207 km² to 525 km² (154%), the number of its inhabitants increased from 1.05 million to 1.6 million (52%), and the number of the districts augmented from 14 to 22 (57%), thus becoming the seventh metropolis of Europe in its time.

The only difference between the 1950s Greater Budapest and  Budapest is that Soroksár, a part of District 20, voted for its independence in 1992, and in 1994 it became a separate District 23. The total area of Budapest remained the same.

In 1950, Inner Budapest (former Little Budapest) had 1.05 million inhabitants and the annexed suburbs 0.55 million. Now Inner Budapest has only 0.95 million inhabitants while the former suburb's population increased to 0.75 million. In the 1960s neighbouring villages became the new suburbs (second suburban belt) with rapidly increasing population (from 1950 to 2009 these former villages and small towns population increased from 300,000 to nearly 800,000). Suburbanization and motorization generated traffic jams on urban multi-lane highways. 1 million cars run in Budapest on a weekday.

See also

References
Andás Sipos: Formation of Greater Budapest (Hungarian)

Demographics of Budapest
History of Budapest
1949 in Europe